Moses Ford (born February 9, 1964) is a former American football wide receiver who played for the Pittsburgh Steelers. He only played in one game as a replacement player.

References

Living people
1964 births
Pittsburgh Steelers players
American football wide receivers
People from Dillon, South Carolina
Fayetteville State Broncos football players